In Greek mythology, Telegonus (Ancient Greek: Τηλέγονος means "born afar") was the youngest son of Circe and Odysseus and thus, brother to Agrius and Latinus or Nausithous and Nausinous. In some accounts, he was called the son of the nymph Calypso and Odysseus instead.

Mythology 
When Telegonus had grown to manhood, his mother Circe sent him in search of Odysseus, who by this time had finally returned to Ithaca from the Trojan War. Shipwrecked on Ithaca by a storm, Telegonus believed mistakenly that he had made landfall on Corcyra (Corfu) and, assailed by hunger, began plundering the island. Odysseus and his oldest son, Telemachus, defended their city and, in the ensuing melée, Telegonus accidentally killed his father with a lance tipped with the venomous spine of a stingray. Telemachus married Telegonus' mother, the enchantress Circe, while Telegonus took to wife Odysseus' widow Penelope. By Penelope, he was the father of Italus who, according to some accounts, gave his name to Italy.

This is the story told in the Telegony, an early Greek epic that does not survive except in a summary, but which was attributed to Eugamon or Eugammon of Cyrene and written as a sequel to the Odyssey.  Variants of the story are found in later poets: for example, in a tragedy by Sophocles, Odysseus Acanthoplex (which also does not survive), Odysseus finds out from an oracle that he is doomed to be killed by his son.  He assumes that this means Telemachus, whom he promptly banishes to a nearby island. When Telegonus arrives on Ithaca, he approaches Odysseus' house, but the guards do not admit him to see his father; a commotion arises, and Odysseus, thinking it is Telemachus, rushes out and attacks.  In the fighting, he is killed by Telegonus. This story has many similarities with the more well-known tale of Oedipus.

In Italic and Roman mythology, Telegonus became known as the founder of Tusculum, a city just to the southeast of Rome, and sometimes also as the founder of Praeneste, a city in the same region (modern Palestrina). Ancient Roman poets regularly used phrases such as "walls of Telegonus" (e.g. Propertius 2.32) or "Circaean walls" to refer to Tusculum.

See also
Gáe Bulg

Notes

References 

 Apollodorus, The Library with an English Translation by Sir James George Frazer, F.B.A., F.R.S. in 2 Volumes, Cambridge, MA, Harvard University Press; London, William Heinemann Ltd. 1921. . Online version at the Perseus Digital Library. Greek text available from the same website.
Gaius Julius Hyginus, Fabulae from The Myths of Hyginus translated and edited by Mary Grant. University of Kansas Publications in Humanistic Studies. Online version at the Topos Text Project.
 Hesiod, Theogony from The Homeric Hymns and Homerica with an English Translation by Hugh G. Evelyn-White, Cambridge, MA.,Harvard University Press; London, William Heinemann Ltd. 1914. Online version at the Perseus Digital Library. Greek text available from the same website.
 Lucius Mestrius Plutarchus, Moralia with an English Translation by Frank Cole Babbitt. Cambridge, MA. Harvard University Press. London. William Heinemann Ltd. 1936. Online version at the Perseus Digital Library. Greek text available from the same website.

Children of Circe
Children of Odysseus